Permatang Tinggi is a small town in Central Seberang Perai District, Penang, Malaysia. It is situated not far from Bukit Mertajam. It is also located with a short distance from Penang-Kuala Lumpur North-South Expressway (Bukit Tambun exit). 

Central Seberang Perai District
Populated places in Penang